Cossitt is a surname. Notable people with the surname include:

Franceway Ranna Cossitt (1790–1863), American Presbyterian minister
Jennifer Cossitt (born 1948), Canadian politician, wife of Thomas
Thomas Cossitt (1927–1982), Canadian politician